Takashi Shibata (born 20 April 1951) is a Japanese biathlete. He competed in the 10 km sprint event at the 1980 Winter Olympics.

References

1951 births
Living people
Japanese male biathletes
Olympic biathletes of Japan
Biathletes at the 1980 Winter Olympics
Sportspeople from Hokkaido